Khatir Afridi  (1929 – August 24, 1968) was a Pashto language poet from Pakistan.

Life
He was born in the Zakha Khel tribe in Saddu Khel village of Khyber agency. He was a gardener by profession in a nearby high school (now a F.C. fort). He never went to school for formal education.
He was a closed friend of Ashna.
His grave in Saddu khel graveyard which have a small tample. And have written a poetry in his grave (Che pa qabar may tery gy Hudy da para : Lag sha mata hapa newaly za ba mar yam)

He wrote songs that became known in Pakistan and Afghanistan. He joined a poetry society where he got guidance from Hamza Shinwari and Nazir Shinwari. He had Tuberculosis for ten years and died at the age of 39, leaving behind a son who and his cousin compiled his father's work into a volume.

References

Pashto-language poets
Pakistani poets
Pashtun people
1929 births
1968 deaths
People from Khyber District
Afridi people